Riddles is a surname. Notable people with the surname include:

 Libby Riddles (born 1956), American dog musher
 Nat Riddles (1952–1991), blues harmonica player
 Robert Riddles (1892–1983), British locomotive engineer

See also
 Riddle (surname)
 Riddle (disambiguation)